Alvin Stardust is the second album by English pop singer Alvin Stardust, released in 1974 on the Magnet Records label.

Track listing
"Red Dress" (Peter Shelley)
"Heartbeat" (Alvin Stardust)
"Just Love Me Baby" (Alvin Stardust, John Fiddy)
"Where's She Gone" (Peter Shelley, Alvin Stardust)
"You You You" (Peter Shelley)
"Chilli Willi" (Peter Shelley)
"Jump Down!" (Peter Shelley, John Hudson, Dave Maynerd)
"Shake On Little Roller!" (Peter Shelley)
"Tell Me Why" (Peter Shelley)
"First Train Out" (Peter Shelley)
"Blind Fool" (Peter Shelley, Alvin Stardust)

All songs published by Magnet Records Ltd. 1974.

Production
Producer - Peter Shelley
Recording Engineer - John Hudson
Assistant Engineer - James Guthrie
Musical Director - John Fiddy
Front Album Cover Photography - Kate Simon
Back Album Cover Photography - Brian Aris
Design - National Publicity

References

1974 albums
Magnet Records albums
Alvin Stardust albums